Illig Qaghan may refer to:
Illig Qaghan, one of the qaghans of the Eastern Turkic Khaganate.
Bumin Qaghan, founder of the First Turkic Khaganate.